Gamma Bros is a 2006 Flash shoot 'em up game developed by American game indie game studio PixelJAM Games, released as a free online title. It was nominated for "Best Web Browser Game" at the 2007 Independent Games Festival. It was the studio's first game after the mini-game Ratmaze. The game was also released as a smartphone game in 2016.

In the game, the player takes control of brothers Buzz and Zap Gamma who are on their way home from a galactic commute and must survive hoards of oncoming enemies.

References

External links

2006 video games
Browser games
Flash games
Freeware games
Indie video games
Shoot 'em ups
Single-player video games
PixelJAM Games games